The 14th African Swimming Championships were held from 11 to 17 October 2021 at the Trust Sports Emporium in Accra, Ghana.

Participating countries

Medal table

Medal summary

Men

Women

Mixed

References

External links
Results

African Swimming Championships
International sports competitions hosted by Ghana
Swimming Championships
African Swimming Championships
African Swimming Championships
October 2021 sports events in Africa